The 2014 SEC men's basketball tournament was the postseason men's basketball tournament for the Southeastern Conference (SEC) held from March 12–16, 2014 in Atlanta at the Georgia Dome. The tournament winner, Florida, received the SEC's automatic bid to the 2014 NCAA men's basketball tournament. However, like most major NCAA Division I conference tournaments, the SEC Tournament does not determine the official conference champion, since the SEC has awarded its men's basketball championship to the team or teams with the best regular season record since the 1950–51 season. Florida, the #1 seed, beat #2 seed Kentucky in the championship game 61–60, with Florida stopping Kentucky from making a last second game-winning shot.

Seeds

Schedule

Bracket

* denote overtime period

Game statistics

First round

Second round

Quarterfinals

Semifinals

Championship game

References

SEC men's basketball tournament
SEC men's basketball tournament
SEC men's basketball tournament
SEC men's basketball tournament
2014 in Atlanta
Basketball competitions in Atlanta
College sports tournaments in Georgia (U.S. state)